Gnawa Diffusion is an Algerian Gnawa music band based in Grenoble, France. The group's lead singer, Amazigh (literally meaning 'Free Man' in Tamazight), is the son of the Algerian writer and poet Kateb Yacine. Although there is a strong Gnawa influence, the band is noted for its mix of reggae and roots music. Gnawa Diffusion is very popular in Algeria and is also well known in many other countries including Morocco, Tunisia and France. The band's lyrics are in Algerian Arabic, Tamazight, French and English. Gnawa Diffusion started their career in 1993 with the release of the album Légitime différence.

Members of the band:
 Amazigh Kateb - vocal and gimbri
 Mohamed Abdennour (Ptit Moh) - Algerian mandole, banjo, krakebs, choir
 Pierre Bonnet - bass
 Philippe Bonnet - drums
 Salah Meguiba - Keyboard, oriental percussion, choir
 Pierre Feugier - guitar, choir, krakebs
 Abdel Aziz Maysour
 Amar Chaoui - percussionist, choir

The lead singer's lyrics are often controversial. Themes range from discussions of poverty in Algeria or corruption in government to denunciations of global military actions and perceived imperialism. Nevertheless, in spite of a strong political direction, this band also has numbers which focus on self-determination and improvement.

Discography 

 2012: Shock El Hal
 2007: Fucking Cowboys (D'JAMAZ Production)
 2003: Souk System (Warner)
 2002: DZ Live (Next Musique)
 1999: Bab el Oued - Kingston (Musisoft)
 1997: Algeria (Melodie)
 1993: Légitime différence

References

External links
  - an interview with the lead singer in English.
 - French interview.

Algerian musical groups
1993 establishments in France